Lower Shabelle (Maay: Shibelithy Hoosy) is an administrative region (gobol) in southern Somalia.

Geography
Lower Shabelle is bordered by the regions of Banaadir, Middle Shabelle (Shabeellaha Dhexe), Hiran, Bay, Middle Jubba (Jubbada Dhexe) and by the Somali Sea. It is named after the Shebelle River, which passes through it.

Until 1984, when the regions were reassigned, it was part of the larger Benadir region and its capital was Mogadishu. Its capital is now Merca.

Districts
Lower Shabelle Region is divided into eleven districts:

 Afgooye District
 Barawa District
 Kurtunwarrey District
 Merca District
 Qoryooley District
 Sablaale District
 Wallaweyn District
 Awdheegle District
 Jannaale District
 Shalambood District
 Buulo marer District

Major towns

Major towns include 
Afgooye
Merca
Qoryoley
Barawa
Awdheegle
Wanlaweyn
Sablale
Jannaale
Mubaarak
Buulo Mareer
Gobanle
Gendershe
Daarusalam

Violence in Golweyn
On 30 July 2017, an AMISOM convoy was ambushed by al-Shabaab insurgents, killing and wounding several Ugandan soldiers.

Eight children were killed and dozens were wounded when a bomb exploded in Golweyn on 31 January 2021.

Notes

External links
Administrative map of Lower Shabelle

 
Regions of Somalia